Dan Parkinson may refer to:

 Dan Parkinson (footballer) (born 1992), English footballer
 Dan Parkinson (author) (1935–2001), American author